The list of shipwrecks in August 1832 includes ships sunk, foundered, grounded, or otherwise lost during August 1832.

2 August

3 August

4 August

8 August

10 August

11 August

12 August

13 August

14 August

15 August

16 August

22 August

27 August

28 August

29 August

Unknown date

References

1832-08